The Manomet Mills are a historic textile mill complex on the north side of New Bedford, Massachusetts. They are located between Riverside Avenue and the Acushnet River, north of Manoment Street and the Whitman Mills. The complex consists of three Classical Revival brick buildings, built between 1903 and 1907. The main building, Mill No. 1, is a 54-bay three story structure that was built in 1903. It is attached to Mill No. 2 (1907), of similar size, by a single story brick structure. The third building is the Mill No. 2 Department Room (1907), a two-story brick building that was originally connected to the other two via overhead bridges, now removed. The mill complex was the main operating site of the Manoment Mill Company, which produced cotton yarn until about 1928. The buildings were sold in that year to the Delaware Rayon Company, which went bankrupt in 1954. Mill No. 2 was then used by the Acushnet Process Company for the manufacture of golf balls, while Mill No. 1 continued to be used for rayon production, a chemically intensive and environmentally hazardous process.

Mills Nos. 1 and 2 were occupied by the Cliftex Corporation. They have since been redeveloped into residences. The mill complex was listed on the National Register of Historic Places in 2012.

See also
National Register of Historic Places listings in New Bedford, Massachusetts
List of mills in New Bedford, Massachusetts

References

Historic districts in Bristol County, Massachusetts
Industrial buildings and structures on the National Register of Historic Places in Massachusetts
Buildings and structures in New Bedford, Massachusetts
National Register of Historic Places in New Bedford, Massachusetts
Historic districts on the National Register of Historic Places in Massachusetts